Tyler Artolo Saladino (born July 20, 1989) is an American former professional baseball infielder. He played in Major League Baseball (MLB) for the Chicago White Sox and Milwaukee Brewers and for the Samsung Lions of the KBO League.

Amateur career
Born and raised in San Diego, California, Saladino attended University City High School, where he was a standout in baseball and held a 3.1 GPA. Saladino then attended Palomar College in San Marcos, California, before transferring to Oral Roberts University in Tulsa, Oklahoma. In his two years at Palomar as a shortstop and third baseman, Saladino hit .399 and .616 in conference play. During his time at Palomar, Saladino was drafted by the Houston Astros in the 36th round of the 2008 draft, but turned it down to continue with college.

Professional career

Chicago White Sox
Saladino was drafted out of Oral Roberts University by the Chicago White Sox in the seventh round of the 2010 Major League Baseball draft. In August 2014, he had Tommy John surgery. The White Sox added him to their 40-man roster on November 20, 2014.

Saladino was called up and made his major league debut on July 10, 2015. Saladino spent the 2016 and 2017 seasons with the major league club, playing in 172 contests for the White Sox.

Milwaukee Brewers
On April 19, 2018, Saladino was traded to the Milwaukee Brewers for cash considerations. He was optioned to Triple-A Colorado Springs Sky Sox. Saladino was non-tendered and became a free agent on December 2, 2019.

Samsung Lions
On December 24, 2019, Saladino signed with the Samsung Lions of the KBO League. Saladino was waived by the Lions on July 29, 2020 due to an injury.

References

External links

1989 births
Living people
Baseball players from San Diego
Major League Baseball infielders
American expatriate baseball players in South Korea
Chicago White Sox players
Milwaukee Brewers players
Palomar Comets baseball players
Oral Roberts Golden Eagles baseball players
Bristol White Sox players
Kannapolis Intimidators players
Winston-Salem Dash players
Mesa Solar Sox players
Birmingham Barons players
Charlotte Knights players
Colorado Springs Sky Sox players
Wisconsin Timber Rattlers players
San Antonio Missions players
Samsung Lions players